is a women's football club playing in Japan's Nadeshiko League Division 1. Its hometown is the city of Himeji.

Squad

Current squad

Results

References

External links
 AS Harima ALBION official site
 Japanese Club Teams

Women's football clubs in Japan
Association football clubs established in 1991
1991 establishments in Japan
Sports teams in Hyōgo Prefecture
Sport in Himeji